This is a list of locomotives that have worked for the Norfolk and Western Railway.

Steam locomotives

Electric locomotives

Diesel locomotives

Diesel locomotives acquired prior to 1964 mergers (all retired during mid 70s to mid 80s)

Diesel locomotives acquired through 1964 mergers
ex Virginian Railway locomotives in 1959
ex-Wabash Railway locomotives
ex Nickel Plate Road locomotives
ex Akron, Canton and Youngstown Railroad locomotives
ex Pittsburgh and West Virginia Railway locomotives

Diesel locomotives acquired before 1982 merger in Norfolk Southern

References
King, E.W. in 
Rosenberg, Ron; Archer, Eric H. (1973). Norfolk & Western Steam (The Last 25 Years). New York, NY: Quadrant Press, Inc.. pp. 11–16, 77–78. .

 
Norfolk and Western Railway